Events from the year 1698 in Denmark

Incumbents
 Monarch – Christian V

Events
 1 July – Den Københavnske Post-Rytter, a weekly newspaper, is published for the first time.

Full date missing
 Danmarksnagore becomes part of Danish India.
 Ny Hollænderby (now Frederiksberg) is destroyed by fire.
 Vodroffgård is established on the west side of St. Jørgen's Lake outside Copenhagen.

Births
 24 August – Erik Pontoppidan, author, bishop, historian and antiquary (died 1764)
 25 December – Jens Høysgaard, philologist (died 1773)

Full date missing
 Hannibal Sehested, statesman (died 1666)

Deaths
 16 March – Leonora Christina Ulfeldt, noblewoman and writer (born 1621)
 6 October – Erik Tylleman, governors of the Danish Gold Coast (born unknown)
 4 November – Rasmus Bartholin, scientist (born 1625)

References

 
Denmark
Years of the 17th century in Denmark